is a Japanese consumer finance company, or sarakin. On September 28, 2010 it filed a petition for commencement of a corporate re-organisation under the Japanese Corporate Reorganisation Act.

Services
The Group's principal activity is the provision of consumer financial services, namely to the sub prime segment. This market was previously viewed as an area of money lenders and crime related activities. However, through a network of professional outlets, unmanned outlets, internet outlets and cash dispensers and ATMs, Takefuji claimed to revolutionise the market. The operations were carried out through the following divisions: Consumer Financing division deals with unsecured and non-guaranteed loans, internet financing, debt counseling services, credit cards and the Other Operations division which deals with other financing, parking lot operations, golf course operations, venture capital, Karaoke booth operations, re-insurance. As of 31-Mar-2005, the Group consisted of the parent company, five domestic consolidated subsidiaries and five overseas subsidiaries.

Scandal
Once Japan's most profitable consumer finance company, Takefuji's reputation has been tarnished since founder and former chairman Yasuo Takei pleaded guilty in 2004 to charges he ordered illegal wiretaps on journalists. Now he's looking for a buyer for part or all of his family's 50-plus percent share in the company. Tokyo Goldman Sachs Group and Sumitomo Mitsui Financial Group are bidding for a controlling stake. Takefuji makes personal loans at some 530 branches across Japan, charging as much as 29% interest.

Sports
The company also owned Takefuji Bamboo, a professional women's volleyball team.

See also
 Loans in Japan

External links
 Takefuji Corporation
 Takefuji Corporation IR information

Financial services companies of Japan
Companies formerly listed on the Tokyo Stock Exchange